Oru Paisa Tamilan was a Tamil language weekly magazine, which was published and edited by Iyothee Thass, a Dalit activist. It started its publication on 9 June 1907 in Royapettah. It was later renamed simply as Tamilan (Thamizhan). It ceased publication in 1934.

Publications 
Thass revived Tamil Buddhism through his writing. He and others wrote several articles critical of Hinduism and Brahminism. The magazine had the dialogues of Tamil Nationalism and laid the foundation for the Dravidian politics.

References

Defunct magazines published in India
Defunct political magazines
Weekly magazines published in India
Magazines established in 1907
Magazines disestablished in 1934
Tamil-language magazines
Political magazines published in India